The European Ramblers Association (ERA;) is a network organisation working for promotion of walking, hiking, creating trails, exchange of the know-how over the borders and secure the rights of free access to nature for the walkers. Through this work, ERA also cares for protecting and developing of European cultural heritage and for strengthening of mutual understanding between European citizens.

Already at the beginning of its existence, ERA started creating a network of European long-distance paths maintained by its member organisations to make it possible to walk all over Europe on foot to strengthen the connection people to people over the borders. From 2017 the network consists of 12 E-paths and covers more than 70.000 km crisscrossing Europe. An E-path is a long-distance path crossing a minimum of 3 European countries. Marking and maintenance of the path is the responsibility of the member organisations.

References 

Hiking organizations
Hiking governing bodies